Davis Carpenter (December 25, 1799 – October 22, 1878) was a United States representative from New York.

Carpenter was born in Walpole, New Hampshire, on December 25, 1799, where he studied medicine. He graduated from Middlebury College, Vermont, in 1824, where he studied law. He was admitted to the bar and commenced practice in Brockport, New York.

Carpenter was elected as a Whig to the 33rd United States Congress to fill the vacancy caused by the resignation of Azariah Boody and served from November 8, 1853, to March 3, 1855. He was an unsuccessful candidate for reelection in 1854 to the 34th United States Congress.  He engaged in the practice of medicine in Brockport, New York, where he died there October 22, 1878, and is interred in High Street Cemetery.

External links

1799 births
1878 deaths
People from Walpole, New Hampshire
Middlebury College alumni
Whig Party members of the United States House of Representatives from New York (state)
19th-century American politicians
People from Brockport, New York